KGLS may refer to:

 KHMY, an FM radio station in Hutchinson and Pratt, Kansas, United States (call sign "KGLS" from 1983 to 1998)
 KGLS-LP, a low-power radio station (99.1 FM) licensed to Tillamook, Oregon, United States
 the ICAO code for Scholes International Airport at Galveston, in Galveston, Texas, United States